Dance Premier League is an Indian dance reality show that premiered on Sony TV on 9 October 2009. The series is judged by the known Bollywood film actress Rani Mukerji, and famous Indian choreographer Shiamak Davar who guides all six teams as an 'umpire'. The series replaced Sony TV's long running dance show Boogie Woogie.

Format
The show consists of six teams, consisting of eight dancers each, that are chosen at auditions across India. One of the six teams consists of NRIs.
Each zonal team will play against every other zone.
Each match will have a solo, a duo and a group round. The tally of all three rounds will decide the winner. 
The scoring is like cricket runs, e.g., duck, single, boundary, sixer, etc. The winning team gets 2 points.
At the end of each match, awards are also given just like cricket, e.g., Man of the match, most 6's, most 4's etc.
After the league matches the top four teams will play semifinals and then the top two will fight in the finals.
The points are awarded by the choreographers whose teams have not performed on the day. Shiamak Davar, aworld renowned choreographer is the match umpire and he can question or raise an objection to the points awarded. 
Rani Mukerji, DPL ki Rani (Queen), will choose the man of the match and also award runs for the performances.
Man of the match gets 6 runs and these runs are added to the Round 3 score of their team.

Teams

Slogans and points

 The Official supporters! came to the auditions merely to promote their movies which released at the time. These "official supporters" did not appear on the show.

Fixtures
Winning team names shown in bold

References

External links
Dance Premier League Official Site
Dance Premier League Official Blog

Sony Entertainment Television original programming
Indian reality television series
2009 Indian television series debuts
Indian game shows
2009 Indian television series endings